No Coincidence may refer to:

No Coincidence, a 1997 album by Jocasta

"No Coincidence", a song by Kelly Rowland from the album Simply Deep, 2002
"No Coincidence", a song by Khalil from the album Prove It All, 2017